Podocarpus trinitensis is a species of conifer in the family Podocarpaceae.  It is endemic to Trinidad and Tobago, where it has only been recorded from the island of Trinidad.  It has been recorded from 13 distinct localities in Trinidad, including sites in the Central Range and in central and eastern areas of the Northern Range.

Conservation status
Podocarpus trinitensis is considered a near threatened species by the IUCN.

References

trinitensis
Least concern plants
Endemic flora of Trinidad and Tobago
Taxonomy articles created by Polbot
Plants described in 1948